Pyotr Yefimovich Isakov (July 1900, Nikolskoye, Pokrov Uyezd, Vladimir Governorate – April 3, 1957 in Moscow) was a Soviet football player and manager.

International career
Isakov made his debut for USSR on November 16, 1924 in a friendly against Turkey.

External links
  Profile

1900 births
1957 deaths
Russian footballers
Soviet footballers
Soviet Union international footballers
Soviet football managers
Soviet Top League players
FC Asmaral Moscow players
FC Spartak Moscow managers
FC Spartak Moscow players

Association football forwards